Dr. Anil Maurya is an Indian politician and a member of 17th Legislative Assembly, Uttar Pradesh of India. He represents the Ghorawal constituency in Sonbhadra district of Uttar Pradesh. He is a member of the Bharatiya Janata Party.

Early life
Anil Kumar Maurya was born on 20 October 1969 in Akatha village of Varanasi district of Uttar Pradesh. He got his early education at his native village. He completed his Ph.D. in 2008 from Mahatma Gandhi Kashi Vidyapeeth, Varanasi. He started taking part in political activities during studies in Kashi Vidyapeeth.

Political career
Anil Kumar Maurya was elected as Member of Uttar Pradesh legislative assembly from Rajnagar assembly seat in Mirzapur in 2007 as a Bahujan Samaj Party candidate. However he lost his second election in 2012. He was expelled from BSP in 2016 for alleged anti-party activities. After expulsion from BSP, Maurya joined Bharatiya Janata Party. He got elected again as MLA from Ghorawal assembly seat in Sonbhadra district in 2017 defeating his close contestant Ramesh Chandra from Samajwadi Party with a margin of 57,649 votes.

Posts held

References

People from Varanasi district
Bharatiya Janata Party politicians from Uttar Pradesh
Uttar Pradesh MLAs 2017–2022
Living people
1969 births
Uttar Pradesh MLAs 2022–2027